The Government of Guillermo Lasso has governed the Republic of Ecuador since May 24, 2021, after the victory of Guillermo Lasso in the 2021 presidential elections.

History

2022 protests 

In June 2022, anti-government protests broke out in Ecuador.

Cabinet

References 

Lasso
Government of Ecuador
2021 establishments in Ecuador
Cabinets established in 2021
2020s in politics